Dewey H. Reed (July 21, 1897 – February 23, 1966) was an American educator and potician.

Reed was born in Raymond Township, Stearns County, Minnesota. He graduated from Sauk Centre High School in Sauk Centre, Minnesota, in 1916. Reed received his bachelor's degree from St. Cloud State University and taught in several high schools in Fairhaven, Minnesota, Bigfork, Minnesota, and Bovey, Minnesota. He then taught social studies in St. Cloud, Minnesota. Reed lived in St. Cloud, Minnesota with his wife and family. Reed served in the Minnesota House of Representatives from 1949 to 1960. Reed died at the St. Cloud Hospital, in St. Cloud, Minnesota on February 23, 1966 after suffering from a fall at his home on February 21, 1966. The funeral and burial was in St. Cloud, Minnesota.

References

1896 births
1966 deaths
People from Stearns County, Minnesota
Politicians from St. Cloud, Minnesota
St. Cloud State University alumni
Schoolteachers from Minnesota
Members of the Minnesota House of Representatives
Accidental deaths in Minnesota